Tamalia coweni, the Manzanita leaf gall aphid, is a species of aphid in the family Aphididae.

References

Aphids
Insects described in 1905
Gall-inducing insects